Amazing Radio is an international radio station first broadcast originally on digital radio in the United Kingdom. The station plays new music from a number of music genres including pop, rock, indie, hip hop, electronica and jazz. The station originally broadcast on the Digital One ensemble which replaced the temporary Birdsong test transmission which had been running for a year and a half beforehand. The station discontinued its DAB presence in 2012 to become an Internet-only radio station, but later returned to DAB in London and Dublin. The station subsequently decided it was not worth paying to be on DAB when so much radio listening is now online.

The station originally took its music from its sister website amazingtunes.com and encourages its listeners to have their say as to which songs should make the station's playlist.

Artists to have been played extensively by the station since their earliest recordings include Bastille, Nine Lies, Tom Odell, Haim, The 1975, Chvrches and London Grammar.

Since 2010, the station has broadcast a weekly chart on Sunday afternoons. The first chart-topper was 'Spider' by Tom And The Tides (an early recording by Tom Odell).

In 2020, a separate service was launched, aimed at listeners in the USA, with different presenters.

Presenters 
Previous notable presenters have included Simon Raymonde and Kathryn Tickell.

References 

Radio stations in the United Kingdom
Digital-only radio stations
Radio stations established in 2009